Heath MacDonald  (born 9 May 1966) is a Canadian politician, who is the Member of Parliament for Malpeque. He was previously elected to the Legislative Assembly of Prince Edward Island in the 2015 provincial election, representing the electoral district of Cornwall-Meadowbank as a member of the Liberal Party until he resigned on 18 August 2021 in order to run in the 2021 Canadian federal election.

On 20 May 2015, MacDonald was appointed to the Executive Council of Prince Edward Island as Minister of Economic Development and Tourism. On 10 January 2018, MacDonald was named Minister of Finance in a cabinet shuffle.

A resident of Cornwall, Prince Edward Island, MacDonald has worked as a tourism operator and as executive director of Quality Tourism Services.

On 21 June 2021, MacDonald announced he would seek the nomination to run for the federal Liberal party in Malpeque. He won the nomination later that summer and was elected in the 2021 federal election.

Electoral record

References

External links

Living people
Members of the Executive Council of Prince Edward Island
People from Queens County, Prince Edward Island
Prince Edward Island Liberal Party MLAs
21st-century Canadian politicians
Finance ministers of Prince Edward Island
1966 births
Members of the House of Commons of Canada from Prince Edward Island
Liberal Party of Canada MPs